Wang Jianwu (born August 1958) is a Chinese military officer and the current political commissar of the Southern Theater Command, one of the five military regions of the People's Liberation Army. Wang was promoted to the rank of general.  He is a member of the 19th CPC Central Committee.

Biography 
Wang was born in Luoning County, Henan, in August 1958. He served in various posts in the Jinan Military Region before becoming political commissar of the Tibet Military District in 2016. He was deputy director of the Political Work Department of the Central Military Commission and deputy leader of the Leading Group on Poverty Alleviation and Development of the State Council in May 2018, and held that offices until January 2019. On 17 January 2019, Wang was appointed political commissar of the Southern Theater Command, replacing Wei Liang.

References

1958 births
Living people
Politicians from Luoyang
People's Liberation Army generals from Henan
Political commissars of Southern Theater Command
Members of the 19th Central Committee of the Chinese Communist Party
People's Republic of China politicians from Henan
Chinese Communist Party politicians from Henan